The Brasil Tennis Cup was a professional women's tennis tournament contested in various Brazilian cities since 1977. The last edition was played on outdoor hard courts in Florianópolis, Brazil. In 2015, the tournament was held on clay courts. The event is affiliated with the Women's Tennis Association (WTA), and is an International-level tournament on the WTA Tour.

Results

Singles

Doubles

References

External links 
 
 Tournament info at WTA

 
WTA Tour
Sport in Florianópolis
Recurring sporting events established in 2013
2013 establishments in Brazil
Recurring sporting events disestablished in 2016
2016 disestablishments in Brazil